Middle River is an unincorporated community and census-designated place in Baltimore County, Maryland, United States. The population was 33,203 at the 2020 census. A Middle River Train Station first appeared on the 1877 G.M. Hopkins & Co Baltimore County Map and by 1898 had a designated Post Office and modest street grid. The town expanded during the 1930s and 1940s and established the "Aero Acres" housing community which borders the railroad tracks and Martin Blvd. to serve as housing for people working at the Martin Aerospace Company. For this development, the architecture firm of Skidmore, Owings & Merrill designed gable-roofed Cape Cod houses with dimensions of 24 feet (7.3 m) by 28 feet (8.5 m), featuring large commercial-style windows in their principal rooms. In 1941 a total of 600 homes were built at Aero Acres using this design from Cemento (a cement/asbestos material).[2]

Geography
Middle River is located at  (39.333957, −76.440502).

Demographics

At the 2000 census, there were 23,958 people, 9,425 households, and 6,399 families living in the CDP. The racial makeup of the CDP was 82.60% White, 13.21% African American, 0.60% Native American, 1.23% Asian, 0.03% Pacific Islander, 0.86% from other races, and 1.47% from two or more races. Hispanic or Latino of any race were 1.92% of the population.

Of the 9,425 households 33.1% had children under the age of 18 living with them, 46.0% were married couples living together, 16.1% had a female householder with no husband present, and 32.1% were non-families. 25.7% of households were one person and 9.8% were one person aged 65 or older. The average household size was 2.51 and the average family size was 2.99.

The age distribution was 25.9% under the age of 18, 8.0% from 18 to 24, 30.7% from 25 to 44, 22.2% from 45 to 64, and 13.1% 65 or older. The median age was 36 years. For every 100 females, there were 91.1 males. For every 100 females age 18 and over, there were 87.0 males.

History
Middle River was once known as a "Little Appalachia". Before, during, and after World War II many Appalachian migrants settled in the Baltimore area, including Middle River. Appalachian people who migrated to Middle River were largely economic migrants who came looking for work.

Schools
Victory Villa Elementary School was built in the 1930s to teach the children of the Martin Aerospace Center's employees. It was rebuilt in 2018.

Martin Boulevard Elementary School was built in the 1950s and rebuilt on the same property in the 1990s to accommodate the ever-expanding population in the Middle River Community.

Middle River Middle School, originally a junior high school housing seventh through ninth grades, now conforms to the Maryland shift in grades and houses sixth through eighth grades. Students feed into Kenwood High School, located on Stemmers Run Road in Essex. Glenmar Elementary School is located across from Middle River Middle School and Hawthorne Elementary borders Essex.

See also
 Martin State Airport
 Bengie's Drive-In Theatre

References

External links

  Essex-Middle River-White Marsh Chamber of Commerce
 Glenn L. Martin Composite Squadron

Appalachian culture in Maryland
Census-designated places in Baltimore County, Maryland
Census-designated places in Maryland